HLA class II histocompatibility antigen, DO alpha chain is a protein that in humans is encoded by the HLA-DOA gene.

HLA-DOA belongs to the HLA class II alpha chain paralogues. HLA-DOA forms a heterodimer with HLA-DOB. The heterodimer, HLA-DO, is found in lysosomes in B cells and regulates HLA-DM-mediated peptide loading on MHC class II molecules. In comparison with classical HLA class II molecules, this gene exhibits very little sequence variation, especially at the protein level.

References

Further reading

MHC class II